The All Is One is a studio album by Norwegian rock band Motorpsycho, released on August 28, 2020, through Stickman Records and Rune Grammofon. This is the third and final installment in the band's Gullvåg Trilogy with the first installment being 2017's The Tower and the second installment being 2019's The Crucible. The album is available as a double vinyl, double CD and digital download.

Track listing

Personnel
Motorpsycho
Bent Sæther - Lead vocals, bass, guitar, keyboards, drums 
Hans Magnus Ryan - Lead guitar, vocals, keyboards, mandolin, violin, bass
 Tomas Järmyr - Drums, Vocals
Additional Musicians
 Reine Fiske - Guitar
 Lars Horntveth - Saxophones, clarinet
 Ola Kvernberg - Violin

References

2020 albums
Motorpsycho albums